Marrakech   is a 1996 Dutch TV film directed by Michiel van Jaarsveld.

Cast
Mohammed Azaay		
Sacha Bulthuis	... 	Mathilde Trapper
Angelique de Bruijne	... 	Doreen
Eric de Visser	... 	Walter Berkhoff
Khaldoun Elmecky	... 	Ambassador
Leo Hogenboom		
Mnine Houcine	... 	Abdul
Tom Jansen	... 	Simon Trapper
Ari Kant		
Ahmed Lahlil		
Rudolf Lucieer	... 	Pathologist
Rachida Machnoue		
Mimoun Oaïssa	... 	Aziz Jelali
Jawad Sadouk	... 	El Ayashi
Karim Traïdia	... 	Rachid Ouaridia
Mustapha Ziraoui

External links 
 

Dutch television films
1996 films
1990s Dutch-language films